Sometimes, two or more films in a series are shot and produced "back-to-back", which means simultaneously or within a short space of time. This is usually done to eliminate the need to rebuild sets and re-hire actors for sequels, and maintain audience interest in the film series. Films produced this way usually have a well-planned pipeline, where the first film may be in post-production as the second is being shot.

While sometimes a trilogy such as The Lord of the Rings is shot with all three parts back-to-back, it is much more common for only two parts to be shot this way. Often, in a trilogy, the first film will be made on its own, and if it is a success, the remaining two parts will be produced back-to-back. This approach was pioneered by the second and third parts of the Sleepaway Camp trilogy, and has since been applied to the Back to the Future and The Matrix trilogies. Back to the Future Part II, and later, The Matrix Reloaded both ended with the words "To be concluded," a variant on the traditional "To be continued," and a trailer for their respective upcoming sequels.

The following is a list of films that have been produced this way:

List
 Les Misérables - Parts 1, 2 and 3 (1934)
 The Tiger of Eschnapur and The Indian Tomb (both 1938)
 The Count of Monte Cristo (1943)
 Roger la Honte and The Revenge of Roger (1946)
 Mandrin (1947 and 1948)
 The Battle of Stalingrad (1949)
 I tre corsari (1952) and Jolanda, the Daughter of the Black Corsair (1953)
 Stars Over Colombo (1953) and The Prisoner of the Maharaja (1954)
 The Count of Monte Cristo (1954)
 The Aztec Mummy (1957), The Curse of the Aztec Mummy, and The Robot vs. The Aztec Mummy (1958)
 And Quiet Flows the Don (1958)
 The Tiger of Eschnapur (1959) and The Indian Tomb (1959)
 The Buddenbrooks (1959)
 Mistress of the World (1960)
 The Three Musketeers (1961)
 The Count of Monte Cristo (1961)
 Kali Yug: Goddess of Vengeance (1963) and The Mystery of the Indian Temple (1964)
 Anatomy of a Marriage: My Days with Françoise (1964) and Anatomy of a Marriage: My Days with Jean-Marc (1964)
 Der Schatz der Azteken (1965) and Die Pyramide des Sonnengottes (1965)
 Wild, Wild Planet (1966), War of the Planets (1966), War Between the Planets (1966) and Snow Devils (1967)
 War and Peace (1966 and 1967)
 Die Nibelungen (1966 and 1967)
 Kampf um Rom (1968 and 1969)
 Red Lips Sadisterotica (1969) and Kiss Me Monster (1969)
 The Emigrants (1971) and The New Land (1972)
 The Three Musketeers (1973) and The Four Musketeers (1974), shot as one film but split into two during post-production
 1900 (1976)
 Superman (1978) and Superman II (1980) (see also Superman II: The Richard Donner Cut, released 2006)
 Petrovka, 38 (1980) and Ogaryova Street, Number 6 (1980), both films directed by Boris Grigoryev that were based on novels by Yulian Semyonov about Kostenko.
 Trail of the Pink Panther (1982) and Curse of the Pink Panther (1983), parts of the Pink Panther series
 The Outsiders (1983) and Rumble Fish (1983), both films directed by Francis Ford Coppola that were based on novels by S.E. Hinton.
 Missing in Action (1984) and Missing in Action 2: The Beginning (1985), the second film was filmed first, but released later as a prequel
 King Solomon's Mines (1985) and Allan Quatermain and the Lost City of Gold (1986)
 Jean de Florette and Manon des Sources (both 1986)
 Sleepaway Camp II: Unhappy Campers (1988) and III: Teenage Wasteland (1989), sequels to the 1983 film Sleepaway Camp
The Toxic Avenger Part II and The Toxic Avenger Part III: The Last Temptation of Toxie (both 1989) were filmed as one movie but was later re-edited into two
La Révolution française (1989)
 Back to the Future Part II (1989) and Part III (1990), of the Back to the Future film series
 Critters 3 and 4 (both 1991), two films of the Critters series
 The Lost World and Return to the Lost World (both 1992)
 Smoking/No Smoking (1993)
 The Three Colours trilogy: Blue (1993), White (1994) and Red (1994)
 Joan the Maiden (1994)
 Blue in the Face (1995) was conceived and filmed completely ad libbed immediately following production of Smoke (1995)
 Bullet to Beijing (1995) and Midnight in Saint Petersburg (1996)
 Wishmaster 3: Beyond the Gates of Hell (2001) and Wishmaster: The Prophecy Fulfilled (2002)
 The Lord of the Rings trilogy: The Fellowship of the Ring (2001), The Two Towers (2002) and The Return of the King (2003)
 The Matrix Reloaded and The Matrix Revolutions (both 2003), parts of the Matrix series
 The Best of Youth (2003)
 Dracula II: Ascension (2003) and Dracula III: Legacy (2005), both were filmed in 2002.
 Kill Bill: Volume 1 (2003) and Volume 2 (2004), which were originally shot as one film and later edited into two
 Anchorman: The Legend of Ron Burgundy and Wake Up, Ron Burgundy: The Lost Movie (2004), the second being a direct-to-video effort assembled from deleted scenes and outtakes of the first
 Ginger Snaps 2: Unleashed and Ginger Snaps Back: The Beginning (both 2004)
 Hellraiser: Deader and Hellraiser: Hellworld (both 2005)
 Return of the Living Dead: Necropolis and Rave to the Grave (both 2005), the fourth and fifth films in the Return of the Living Dead series
 Pirates of the Caribbean: Dead Man's Chest (2006) and At World's End (2007), the second and third films in the Pirates of the Caribbean series
 Flags of Our Fathers and Letters From Iwo Jima (both 2006)
 Arn – The Knight Templar (2007) and Arn – The Kingdom at Road's End (2008)
 Che Part 1: The Argentine and Che Part 2: Guerilla (both 2008)
 Anaconda 3: Offspring (2008) and Anacondas: Trail of Blood (2009)
 Pulse 2: Afterlife and Pulse 3 (both 2008)
 Feast II: Sloppy Seconds (2008) and Feast III: The Happy Finish (2009)
 Mesrine (2008)
 Shred (2008) and Revenge of the Boarding School Dropouts (2009)
 The Girl Who Played with Fire and The Girl Who Kicked the Hornets' Nest (both 2009)
 Arthur and the Revenge of Maltazard (2009) and Arthur 3: The War of the Two Worlds (2010); the films were edited into Arthur and the Great Adventure (2010) for release in the United Kingdom
 Harry Potter and the Deathly Hallows – Part 1 (2010) and Part 2 (2011)
 Burnt by the Sun 2 (2010) and Burnt by the Sun 2: The Citadel (2011)
 The 10 "chapters" of the Adams Apples film series (2011–2012)
 The Twilight Saga: Breaking Dawn – Part 1 (2011) and Part 2 (2012)
 Gangs of Wasseypur - Part 1 and Part 2 were originally shot as a single film measuring a total of 319 minutes, but because of its over-five-hour length, it was divided into two parts (160 mins and 159 mins, respectively) for the Indian market.
 Nymphomaniac (2013) was originally supposed to be only one complete entry; but, because of its over-five-hour length, Lars von Trier had to split the project into two separate films.
 The Hobbit trilogy: An Unexpected Journey (2012), The Desolation of Smaug (2013) and The Battle of the Five Armies (2014)
 The Hunger Games: Mockingjay – Part 1 (2014) and Part 2 (2015)
 Baahubali: The Beginning (2015) and Baahubali 2: The Conclusion (2017)
 Fifty Shades Darker (2017) and Fifty Shades Freed (2018)
Avengers: Infinity War (2018) and Avengers: Endgame (2019) as part of the conclusion of the Infinity Saga (the first 11 years) of the Marvel Cinematic Universe
 K.G.F: Chapter 1 (2018) and K.G.F: Chapter 2 (2022)
 To All the Boys: P.S. I Still Love You (2020) and To All the Boys: Always and Forever (2021)
 The Kissing Booth 2 (2020) and The Kissing Booth 3 (2021)
 After We Fell (2021) and After Ever Happy (2022)
 Fear Street trilogy: Part One: 1994, Part Two: 1978 and Part Three: 1666 (all 2021)
 Pushpa: The Rise (2021) and Pushpa 2: The Rule (TBA)
 X and Pearl (both 2022)
 Avatar: The Way of Water (2022), Avatar 3 (2024) alongside of footage for in Avatar 4 (2026) and for Avatar 5 (2028)
 The Strangers 3, The Strangers 4 and The Strangers 5 (TBA)
 Avatar 4 (2026) and Avatar 5 (2028)
Avengers: The Kang Dynasty (2025) and Avengers: Secret Wars (2026)

Though not shot entirely back-to-back, the final scene of Star Wars: Episode III – Revenge of the Sith was shot in Tunisia during the production of Star Wars: Episode II – Attack of the Clones in order to avoid another trip to Tunisia for a single scene.

See also
Back-to-back film production
List of films split into multiple parts

References

Back-to-back
Film production